Below is a list of Canadian national under-20 rugby union team rosters for World Rugby sanctioned tournaments.

2008 IRB Junior World Championship Roster
Canada's 26-man squad for the 2008 IRB Junior World Championship in Wales.

2009 IRB Junior World Championship Roster
Canada's 26-man squad for the 2009 IRB Junior World Championship in Japan.

2010 IRB Junior World Trophy Roster
Canada's 26-man squad for the 2010 IRB Junior World Rugby Trophy in Moscow, Russia.

2011 IRB Junior World Trophy Roster
Canada's 26-man squad for the 2011 IRB Junior World Rugby Trophy in Tbilisi, Georgia.

2012 IRB Junior World Trophy Roster

Canada's 26-man squad for the 2012 IRB Junior World Rugby Trophy in Salt Lake City, USA.

2013 IRB Junior World Trophy Roster

Canada's 26-man squad for 2013 IRB Junior World Rugby Trophy in Temuco, Chile.

2014 IRB Junior World Trophy Roster

Canada's 26-man squad for the 2014 IRB Junior World Rugby Trophy in Hong Kong.

2015 World Rugby Junior World Trophy Roster

Canada's 26-man squad for the 2015 World Rugby Under 20 Trophy in Lisbon, Portugal.

2016 World Rugby Junior World Trophy Roster

Canada's 25-man squad for the 2016 North American World Rugby Under 20 Trophy Qualifier in Austin, Texas, USA.

2017 World Rugby Junior World Trophy Roster

Canada's 26-man squad for the 2017 World Rugby Under 20 Trophy in Montevideo, Uruguay.

2018 World Rugby Junior World Trophy Roster

Canada's 26-man squad for the 2018 World Rugby Under 20 Trophy in Bucharest, Romania.

2019 World Rugby Junior World Trophy Roster

Canada's 26-man squad for the 2019 World Rugby Under 20 Trophy in São José dos Campos, Brazil.

References

 
Rugby, under-20